The Foton MP-X is a light commercial van that can seat up to 12 occupants produced by the Chinese automobile manufacturer Foton. The MP-X was sold throughout China and southeast Asian countries including the Philippines and Singapore.

Overview

In 2012, the Foton MP-X was reported to be powered by an inline 4, 2.8 liter turbo diesel that producing 96kW and 280nm of torque with prices ranging from 99.000 yuan. 

As of October 2018, prices of the Foton MP-X ranges from 74,650 to 98,550 yuan.

A different model called the MP-X S was also offered by Foton but was later renamed to Foton View G9.

Foton View G5

An updated variant succeeding the MP-X E called the Foton View G5 was launched in 2019 while styling remains unchanged from the MP-X. The updated model features powertrains that fulfills the National VI Emissions Standards. The View G5 is powered by a 2.0 liter engine developing 136hp and 185N·m mated to a 5-speed manual transmission.

A facelift was unveiled for the 2020 model year Foton View G5 completely changing the front end. The updated model is powered by a 2.0 liter naturally aspirated engine and a 2.4 liter naturally aspirated engine developing 136hp and 160hp respectively. The transmission is a 5-speed manual gearbox.

References

External links 

 Foton MP-X official site

Foton Motor vehicles
2010s cars
Cars of China
Minibuses
Vans
Ambulances